Cinema Jenin is a movie theater in the Palestinian city of Jenin, located in the West Bank.

The new building features plush seating that can accommodate more than 300 people, an outdoor café, art gallery space, a  children's park and playground, and a library that is sponsored by the German Goethe-Institut.  The library and cinema will offer cultural exhibitions and German language classes. It replaced a cinema that closed in 1987.

The cinema is located in the heart of the city, next to the old church, the market (suq) and the main transportation routes. The old cinema had 250 seats on the first floor and another 200 on a balcony.

The cinema is not without its critics.  Many Palestinians boycotted the cinema, claiming that unmarried men and women slept together in the cinema's guest house, and drank alcohol there.  Audience numbers dwindled.  Following death threats that were circulated in the mosques in early 2011, many foreign nationals were evacuated from the Cinema Jenin project, at the request of their governments.

The project
The renovation was carried out as an international charitable effort intended to encourage a culture of cinema-going for the inhabitants of Jenin by showing films of various genres, including fiction films, documentaries, comedies, children’s films, Arabic classics and contemporary movies.

It is planned to have six screenings along with other activities every day. A website has been created to present the various activities of the cinema. Workshops in film making, computers and English will also be offered at the cinema.

The German Government (Auswärtiges Amt) is sponsoring Cinema Jenin with a large donation (press release in German).

The Jenin cinema reopened in August 2010. For the grand reopening they showed a movie called The Heart Of Jenin.

In 2011, Maurizio Fantoni Minnella shot Tonight on Jenin, a documentary about the experience of the cinema and Jenin's inhabitants. The documentary is part of Palestinian Quadrilogy.

See also
Cinema of Palestine
Arab cinema
Israeli–Palestinian conflict
Al-Kasaba Theatre
Cinema for Peace

External links
A revival for Cinema Jenin, video report at Reuters about the initiative
Cinema Jenin Homepage
Dreams of a Nation

References 

Cinema Jenin - Ein deutscher Filmemacher baut das einzige Kino in den Palästinensergebieten, 3Sat, Jan 26, 2009
Cinema Jenin - Ein Kino für Palästina, MDR, Sunday, 18 January 2009
A revival for Cinema Jenin, video report at Reuters about the initiative
A West Bank Ruin, Reborn as a Peace Beacon, by Ethan Bronner, The New York Times, September 11, 2008. 
Hope, pain in film about Palestinian organ donor, By Rebecca Harrison, The Boston Globe, July 14, 2008. 
Ismael Khatib und das geschenkte Herz, by Inge Gunther, Frankfurter Rundschau, August 14, 2008. 
Achmeds Tod lässt andere Kinder leben, Stuttgarter Zeitung, August 13, 2008. 
Ein Herz für Kinder zwischen den Fronten Heilbronner Stimme, July 3, 2008.

Cinemas in the State of Palestine
Theatres in the State of Palestine
1987 establishments in the Palestinian territories
Buildings and structures in Jenin